The Volkswagen Polo Mk5 is the fifth generation of the Polo, a supermini-class car manufactured by Volkswagen since 2009. The vehicle unveiled at the 2009 Geneva Motor Show in March 2009, while the three-door version was unveiled at the 2009 Frankfurt Motor Show in September 2009. A four-door long-wheelbase sedan version has been produced and sold outside Europe in several emerging markets since 2010 either as the Volkswagen Vento or the Volkswagen Polo sedan. A short-wheelbase sedan version was sold in India between 2016 and 2020 as the Volkswagen Ameo.

, the Polo Mk5 is continued to be produced in South Africa as the Polo Vivo. The production of the Mk5 Polo at the India plant stopped in 2022, with the last Polo being sold in August 2022.

Overview 
Internally designated Typ 6R, the Polo Mk5 is based on Volkswagen's PQ25 platform shared with the SEAT Ibiza Mk4 and the Audi A1 Mk1. It was designed by a team led by Walter de Silva, following the styling direction of the Scirocco Mk3 and the Golf Mk6.

The Polo Mk5 is  longer and  wider, while sits  lower to the road than the previous generation Polo. Boot capacity is increased by 10 litres to 280 litres of storage space with 952 litres with the seats folded down. The car is 7.5% lighter than its predecessor. The Polo has thorax airbags and has been awarded a five-star Euro NCAP crash impact rating. For the first time in a Polo, a 7-speed dual clutch transmission and navigation systems with touchscreen controls are available as an option.

Production for the United Kingdom market started in August 2009, with first deliveries beginning in October 2009. Production of the Polo Mk5 in South Africa was announced in November 2009, producing five-door right-hand-drive Polo. As the result, the South African-made Polo was exported throughout many right-hand-drive markets, including UK, Ireland, Australia, Singapore and Malaysia. It was also introduced in India in February 2010 as the first mass-volume product offered by the brand in the country since its arrival in 2007. CKD assembly of the Polo also commenced in Malaysia between 2014 and 2020, with parts imported from India.

The Polo Mk5 is entirely skipped from being sold and produced in Brazil due to the high pricing of the previous generation Polo which results in a low sales figures.

The Volkswagen Polo won the 2010 European Car of the Year, defeating the Toyota iQ and Opel/Vauxhall Astra.

Since 2017, the Polo Mk5 hatchback was succeeded by the Polo Mk6 hatchback in most markets. In South Africa, the Polo Mk5 continued to be produced and marketed in South Africa alongside the newer Polo Mk6 since 2018 as the Polo Vivo, replacing the Polo Mk4-based Polo Vivo. In Russia and other CIS markets, the Polo Mk5 sedan was replaced by the Škoda Rapid-based Polo CK liftback in 2020. In Argentina and several other Latin American markets, the Polo Mk6-based Virtus replaced the Polo sedan Mk5, while in Mexico the Polo Mk5 sedan and hatchback continued to be sold in the country alongside the newer Virtus.

In India, the Polo Mk5 hatchback and sedan continued to be produced and offered in the country until 2022.

Specifications

Features
The European version, with exceptions for the French and Turkish market, includes a standard ESP electronic stabilisation program with Hill Hold Control, head-thorax airbags (integrated in the front seatbacks), belt tensioners and belt force limiters plus seatbelt warning indicator and head restraints, three rear head restraints and Isofix child seat preparation.

In Turkey, ESP and Hill Hold Control are optional equipment on all models except GTI and BlueMotion.

Trim levels
In its native Germany and South Africa as well as some European markets except France, Croatia, Slovenia and Bosnia and Herzegovina, Trendline, Comfortline and Highline trim levels are being offered in all versions.

In France, Italy and Romania, only Comfortline and Highline trim levels are being offered in all versions. In Croatia, Bosnia and Herzegovina as well as in Slovenia, trim level situation is not stable, these are Trendline, Comfortline (available up to 2012), Highline and special trim levels including Rabbit (2012-2013), Fresh (2014) and Lounge (2015).

Polo GTI
The Polo GTI was presented together with the CrossPolo at the Geneva Motor Show in early March 2010 and was available since the end of May 2010.

Styling-wise, the Polo GTI differs from the standard Polo with its redesigned front and rear bumpers, widened side skirts, roof spoiler, standard fog lights, red brake calipers, 17-inch alloy wheels and a chrome-plated twin tailpipe. It is also equipped with a sports suspension that is about  lower and an extended electronic limited slip differential, which is intended to reduce the vehicle's tendency to understeer by braking the front wheel on the inside of the bend when cornering quickly. In addition, the vehicle battery was relocated from the engine compartment to the spare wheel well for better weight distribution, which in turn reduces the usable luggage compartment volume from 280 to 204 liters.

The 2010-2013 models are equipped with a 1.4-liter engine with turbo and supercharger installed, producing a maximum power  combined with a 7-speed double-clutch transmission and front-wheel-drive. This would correspond to  emissions of 139 g/km.

Since then, the model has been available with a 6-speed manual gearbox or a 7-speed DSG.

Cross Polo 

In June 2010, Volkswagen presented the 2011 edition of the CrossPolo, a crossover-styled version of the Polo. Exclusively available with five doors, it is distinguished from the standard Polo by a redesigned front and rear bumpers, black plastic claddings on the wheel arches and doors, silver roof rails, standard fog lights and 17-inch alloy wheels. The side mirror housings are painted silver regardless of the color of the vehicle. The standard equipment includes sports seats for the driver and front passenger, and leather steering wheel.

The 2011 CrossPolo in Europe is available in petrol and three diesel engines, all Euro 5 compliant.

In India, the CrossPolo was launched in August 2013 with a sole option of a 1.2-litre diesel engine. The 1.2-litre petrol version was released in January 2015. It was discontinued in 2017 due to slow sales.

Facelift 
The Polo 6R was facelifted in 2014 and is now known as the Polo 6C. With this came subtle exterior styling such as redesigned bumpers. The interior was re-vamped which now includes a touch screen as standard and a new steering wheel. The facelift Polo adds technology such as Automatic Post-Collision Braking System as standard across all model lines. It also has CarPlay and Android Auto support since June 2015.

A new 1.4-litre three cylinder diesel engine replaced the 1.2-litre and 1.6-litre diesel units, plus 1.4 TSI 132 kW of GTI was replaced by an Audi-developed 1.8 TSI, produces 141 kW. In 2018 in India, the company replaced the 1.2-litre engine with the 1.0-litre naturally aspirated petrol engine, which has 76 PS and 95 NM of torque.

In September 2019, the Mk5 Polo received another facelift in India. The facelifted Polo for the Indian market received a new front grille and bumpers taken from the Mk5 Polo GTI. This version is also exported to Mexico and Indonesia.

Polo Vivo (South Africa) 
The Polo Mk5 was relaunched in South Africa in February 2018 as the Polo Vivo. It replaced the Polo Mk4-based Polo Vivo and sold alongside the Polo Mk6 as a budget-friendly option. The Polo Vivo is offered in four trim levels including Trendline, Comfortline, Highline, and GT. Three 4-cylinder petrol engines are offered, including a 1.0-litre turbocharged engine, and 1.4-litre and a 1.6-litre naturally-aspirated engines. 5-speed manual gearboxes are available for the naturally-aspirated variants, while a Tiptronic auto is available in the  1.6 model. The GT model comes with a 6-speed manual transmission. The CrossPolo variant of the Polo Mk5 has been repackaged as the Polo Vivo Maxx. It is mostly the same as before except for different style wheels.

Sedan versions

Volkswagen Vento/Polo sedan 

A three-box sedan version of the Polo Mk5 was introduced in 2010. It is known as the Vento in India, Malaysia, Brunei and Mexico. In South Africa, Argentina, Russia, and the Middle East, it is sold as the Polo Sedan. The word Vento means 'wind' in both Italian and Portuguese. It is also known as the Polo Notch in the Philippines.

The Polo sedan or Vento was introduced in India and Russia in 2010, followed by South Africa in May 2011.

The extra  wheelbase offers more rear legroom than the hatchback, while the three-box design generates additional trunk space of 500 liters.

In several markets, it is succeeded by the Volkswagen Virtus, while some markets like Mexico offered the Virtus alongside the Vento for the purpose of keeping a budget-friendly option.

Mexico 
A Mexican version of the Vento was released for the 2014 model year, imported from India. Trim levels are called Style, Active and Highline. VW offers a choice of two engine options: a 1.6-liter naturally aspirated gasoline engine coupled with either a 5-speed manual or a 6-speed automatic gearbox, and a 1.6-liter diesel (TDI) engine coupled with a 5-speed manual gearbox.

In 2016, Volkswagen redesigned the front so it resembled the (at the time) new Jetta (mk7): grill, fascia, fog lights and chrome inserts. It also got visible exhaust and redesigned headlights. The 2016 model also got a 7-speed dual-clutch automatic DSG gearbox for the Diesel engine. The Volkswagen Vento since 2016 has been the best-selling model of the Volkswagen brand and the third best-selling model overall in Mexico.

In the Mexican market, the facelifted Vento arrived in 2020.

India 
At its introduction, the Vento in India was available in four trim levels: the base Trendline, Comfortline, Highline and Highline Plus, with the Highline and Highline Plus also having an automatic option. The Comfortline gets a CD-MP3 music system, body-coloured door mirrors and handles and fog lamps among other features. The Highline features a Touchscreen Infotainment system with integrated USB music, steering-mounted audio controls, leather upholstery, ABS, front airbags, a multi-function display, 15-inch alloy wheels and other standard features. The Highline Plus has a 16-inch alloy wheels, a reverse parking camera and full LED headlamps with LED daytime running lights.

In November 2011, Škoda in India introduced the Rapid which is a rebadged and restyled Vento. The front end design of the Rapid adopts Škoda family's design philosophy instead. Compared to the Vento, the Rapid lacks a 1.2 TSI engine option, and also lacks a DSG transmission option and uses a more traditional 6-speed torque converter instead.

In 2011, VW introduced a special edition called the "Breeze" on the Trendline trim, featuring added accessories. In collaboration with the Indian Premier League authorities, Volkswagen India also offers a special IPL edition alongside the Vento Breeze

The model is offered with one petrol engine, which is a 1.6-litre 4-cylinder MPI engine producing 105 PS; coupled with either 5-speed manual or 6-speed automatic gearbox and one diesel engine (1.6 L, turbocharged 4-cylinder common rail, 105 PS; only 5-speed manual gearbox) options available. In November 2013, the 1.6-litre petrol and 6-speed automatic option was dropped in favour of the new 1.2-litr4-cylinder TSI motor mated to a 7-speed DSG dual clutch automatic. This combination offers superior performance and fuel efficiency compared to the old automatic offering.

In 2014, a facelifted Vento was launched. It carries over the 1.6-litre petrol but has a new 1.5-litre diesel engine derived from the old 1.6-litre due to the excise benefits offered to engines 1.5L and below, in India). The Vento also gets a 7-speed DSG gearbox, with this new 1.5-litre engine. A 1.2-litre TSI engine is also available mated to the 7-speed DSG, producing 103PS.

Along with the Polo, the facelifted version of the Vento was released on 3 September 2019 in India alongside the facelifted Polo. Its styling mimics the Polo GTI version, sharing the same front bumper. Available gearboxes are 6-speed manual transmission and 6-speed tiptronic.

In India, the facelifted version was released in September 2019 whilst older versions of them will be kept on sale for a few years. It is very similar to its GTI version in terms of design and it will be expanded for most markets where the Polo saloon and hatchback versions are sold. Both the Polo and Vento were later facelifted in Mexico in early 2020.

On introduction of Bharat Stage VI emissions norms in India in April 2020, the Vento 1.5 TDI was be discontinued and the petrol engines will be replaced by a new locally manufactured, more fuel-efficient three-cylinder 1.0 TSI engine.

Philippines 
The Polo sedan Mk5 is also known as the Volkswagen Polo Notch in the Philippines. It went on sale in late 2013 and was sourced from India. In May 2018, Volkswagen discontinued the Polo Notch in the Philippines. It was replaced by the Chinese-sourced Volkswagen Santana.

Other markets 
The car became available in Argentina as the Polo Sedan from October 2015 to February 2018, when it was replaced by the Virtus sourced from Brazil.

Volkswagen Ameo 

The Ameo is a notchback sedan based on the hatchback Polo Mk5 which was introduced for the Indian market in June 2016. Slotted between the Polo and the Vento, the Ameo was developed to fit the tax bracket for vehicles under  in length in order to occupy the sub-four metre sedan segment in India. It was produced in India and was marketed with the tagline "German engineering with an Indian heart". The word 'Ameo' is derived from the Latin word 'amo', meaning love.

The Ameo retained  wheelbase and the rear doors from the Polo hatchback, unlike the Polo sedan/Vento. It is also fitted with a shorter front bumper which shaved  from the length of the vehicle, and a lower roof. According to Tilo Klumpp, a senior designer at Volkswagen, initial design proposals of the Ameo resembles a shape of a fastback, with an tailgate sloping from the roofline to the trailing edge. However, market research showed that Indian customers preferred a traditional three-box shape. Development reportedly took two and a half years.

During its introduction to the Indian market, the Ameo is equipped with a 1.2-litre three-cylinder naturally aspirated petrol engine and a 1.5-litre four-cylinder turbocharged diesel engine. It was available in five variants which include Trendline, Comfortline, Comfortline Plus, Highline and Highline Plus.

The Ameo was discontinued in April 2020, as the vehicle was not updated to be compliant with the Bharat Stage 6 emission norms which came into force in that month due to its decreasing sales.

Powertrain 

In addition to the engine options above, BlueMotion Technology versions of the 1.2 TSI are available on some markets.
At the end of 2012, the BlueGT variant has been officially introduced. The Polo BlueGT features improved aerodynamics and a 1.4 turbocharged TSI engine from the new EA211 generation. This new engine features ACT (Active Cylinder Technology), a cylinder deactivation management which deactivates two cylinders at torque outputs from 24 to 100 N·m, allowing the Polo BlueGT with a 6-speed manual transmission to emit only 107 g/km.

In 2013, Volkswagen entered the World Rally Championship with a new Polo-based rally car. To meet the homologation requirements, 2500 Polo R WRCs were produced between September 2013 and March 2014.

Anecdotal reports have appeared of problems with the 66 kW diesel engine, including poor fuel consumption and surging. VW has already made one modification to the particle filter ECU mapping.

Safety
 Euro NCAP: 5 stars

The Polo for India with no airbags and no ABS received 0 stars for adult occupants and 3 stars for toddlers from Global NCAP in 2014.

The Polo for India with 2 airbags and no ABS received 4 stars for adult occupants and 3 stars for toddlers from Global NCAP in 2014.

The Polo Vivo for Africa received 3 stars for adult occupants and 3 stars for toddlers from Global NCAP in 2017 (similar to Latin NCAP 2013).

The Indian-made Polo sedan in its most basic version for Latin America received 5 stars for adult occupants and 3 stars for toddlers from Latin NCAP in 2015.

Polo Wörthersee 09 
A one-off Polo concept car was shown at the Wörthersee GTI meeting in May 2009. Considered as a preview of a future Polo GTI model, the car featured Flash Red paint with black rally stripes, 18-inch "Budapest" wheels, high gloss black interior and aluminum tread plates.

Polo R WRC 

In 2013, Volkswagen entered the World Rally Championship with a new rally car based on Polo. For homologation purposes, 2,500 Polo R WRC street cars were produced between September 2013 and March 2014. The street version features a 2.0 litre turbocharged engine producing 220 PS, and is mated exclusively to 6-speed manual gearbox.

Awards

 European Car of the Year 2010
 Slovenian Car of the Year 2010 
 South African Car of the Year 2011
 Japan Import Car of the Year 2010–2011
 World Car of the Year 2010
 What Car? Supermini of the Year 2010 
 Drive Car of the Year 2010 (Australia) 
 Carsguide Car of the Year 2010 (Australia) 
 Wheels Car of the Year 2010

See also
 Volkswagen Polo for an overview of all models
 Volkswagen Polo Mk1
 Volkswagen Polo Mk2
 Volkswagen Polo Mk3
 Volkswagen Polo Mk4
Volkswagen Polo Mk6
 Volkswagen Vento (A05)

References

External links

Polo 5
Subcompact cars
Front-wheel-drive vehicles
Hatchbacks
Euro NCAP superminis
Global NCAP superminis
Latin NCAP superminis
Cars introduced in 2009
2010s cars
Rally cars

it:Volkswagen Polo#Quinta serie (6R)